Zoosphaerium neptunus, also known as the giant emerald pill millipede, is a species of millipede within the family Arthrosphaeridae. It is the largest known pill-millipede in the world, with some individuals reaching lengths of 90 mm (3.5 inches) long. The species is endemic to Madagascar, where it is known to swarm at certain times of the year.

Description 
Sexual dimorphism is present within the species, with females reaching larger sizes than males. Males can reach up to 45 mm (1.8 inches) long, while females reach 90 mm (3.5 inches) long.

Distribution and habitat 
Zoosphaerium neptunus can be found living in moist lowland rainforest habitats up to elevations of 850 metres above sea level. The species is endemic to Madagascar and is widely distributed in Eastern Madagascar, however populations have also been recorded in Northern and Southern Madagascar.

References

Sphaerotheriida
Endemic fauna of Madagascar
Arthropods of Madagascar
Millipedes of Africa
Animals described in 1872